A Coca-Cola Cup is drinkware with The Coca-Cola Company's logo on it. It may also refer to:

Association football competitions

 EFL Cup in England, known as the Coca-Cola Cup from 1992 to 1998
 Scottish League Cup, known as the Coca-Cola Cup from 1994 to 1998
 Floodlit Cup (Northern Ireland) in Northern Ireland, known as the Coca-Cola Cup from 1995 to 1998
 Federation Cup (India), known as the Coca-Cola Cup for the 1995–96 season

One Day International cricket competitions
 the name of the Sharjah Cup 1998-2000
 2001 Sri Lanka Coca-Cola Cup
 2001 Zimbabwe Coca-Cola Cup

See also
Coca Cola GM, the Greenlandic Football Championship